Beerenberg is a stratovolcano dominating the northeastern end of the Norwegian island of Jan Mayen.

Name 
Its name is Dutch for "Bear Mountain", and comes from the polar bears seen there by Dutch whalers in the early 17th century.

Description 
The upper slopes of the volcano are largely ice-covered, with several major glaciers including five which reach the sea. The longest of the glaciers is the Weyprecht Glacier, which flows from the summit crater via a breach through the northwestern portion of the crater rim, and extends about  down to the sea.

Beerenberg is composed primarily of basaltic lava flows with minor amounts of tephra. Numerous cinder cones have been formed along slope fissures.

History 
There was an Austrian attempt to reach the summit of Beerenberg, presumably whilst the Austrians had a weather station on the island in 1882-83, but the attempt failed due to poor weather. The first recorded ascent was in the summer of 1921, by an expedition led by Dr. P.L. Mercanton, joined by J.M. Wordie, T.C. Lethbridge and three others. The British expedition was taken to the island by the Norwegian meteorological service, which was establishing a wireless station on the island.

Its most recent eruptions took place in 1970 and 1985, both of which were flank eruptions from fissures on the northeast side of the mountain. Other eruptions with historical records occurred in 1732, 1818, and 1851.

See also
List of volcanoes in Norway
List of mountains in Norway by prominence

References

External links

New Jan Mayen Homepage, including general info, photos, blog, and webcam
Old Jan Mayen Homepage , including general info, photos, blog, and webcam
Beerenberg Expedition 2008 Pictures
Pictures and a map of Beerenberg
1970 Beerenberg volcanic eruption captured on film

Landforms of Jan Mayen
Volcanoes of Norway
Mountains of Norway
Holocene stratovolcanoes
Ridge volcanoes
Active volcanoes
Volcanoes of the Arctic Ocean
Extreme points of Earth